James Kenneth Stainton (14 December 1931 – 2009) was an English professional footballer who played in the Football League for Mansfield Town.

He married the operatic soprano Margaret Gale in Sheffield in 1953. They separated in 1961 and later divorced.

References

1931 births
2009 deaths
English footballers
Association football defenders
English Football League players
Bradford (Park Avenue) A.F.C. players
Mansfield Town F.C. players